Hesar-e Tarmani (also Romanized as Ḩeşār-e Tarmanī; also known as Ḩeşār-e Qareh Ḩasanlū) is a village in Bakeshluchay Rural District, in the Central District of Urmia County, West Azerbaijan Province, Iran. According to the 2006 census, its population was 21 inhabitants, in 5 families.

References 

Populated places in Urmia County